Winterbourne Down is a village in South Gloucestershire, England, located on the north-eastern outskirts of Bristol. It is also part of the Civil Parish of Winterbourne. It is demarcated by the Avon Ring Road to the south. The Parish's annual May Day carnival is held here.

The Frome Valley Walkway passes through the village and provides views of the Huckford Viaduct. The village contains the Anglican, All Saints Church and the Methodist Bethesda chapel. Winterbourne Down is also noted for its extensive wooded areas, quarrying legacy and the remains of a Roman camp.

References

External links

Civil Parish of Winterbourne
Villages in South Gloucestershire District